Uwe Hüser (born 21 August 1958) was elected to the Bundestag from Rhineland-Palatinate for the German Green Party in 1987.  His term of office ended in 1990.

In 1993 he became administrator for NABU, an environmental lobby organization.
In 2003 he became Head of Department Internal Services for Federation of German Consumer Organisations .

1958 births
Living people
Members of the Bundestag for Rhineland-Palatinate
Members of the Bundestag for Alliance 90/The Greens